The Perkins Arboretum (128 acres; 51.2 hectares) is the Colby College arboretum, located at 5600 Mayflower Hill Drive in Waterville, Maine, United States. It is used for teaching and research, but its trails are also open to the public.

The Arboretum was established in 1946, later dedicated to the memory of Professor and Mrs. Edward Henry Perkins, and in 1969 expanded to its current size. The Colby Board of Trustees has mandated that the Arboretum "be preserved and protected in its natural state without cutting or changes in the growth and natural habitat as time proceeds".

Arboretum trees include Apples, White Ash, Quaking Aspen, Gray Birch, Paper Birch, Yellow Birch, American Beech, Black Cherry, Dogwood, Eastern Hemlock, Hop-hornbeam, Red Maple, Sugar Maple, Northern Red Oak, White Oak, and Eastern White Pine. Other plants include Speckled Alder, Cattails, Sensitive Fern, Christmas Fern, Bracken, Clubmoss, Partridge Berry, Trillium, and Wintergreen.

See also 
 List of botanical gardens in the United States

External links
Field Guide to the Perkins Arboretum
Arboretum trail maps from Colby College

Arboreta in Maine
Botanical gardens in Maine
Colby College
Protected areas of Kennebec County, Maine
Tourist attractions in Kennebec County, Maine
Waterville, Maine